Vito Bardi (born 18 September 1951) is the 9th and current President of Basilicata since 16 April 2019.

Biography

Military career
Bardi joined the Guardia di Finanza in 1970. He was promoted Colonel, on 31 December 1995, and later Army Corps General in 2009. He served as deputy General Commander of the Guardia di Finanza from 5 September 2013 to 4 September 2014.

During his life, Bardi graduated four times in Economy, in Law, in International and Diplomatic Sciences and in Economic and Financial Security Sciences.

Political career
At the 2019 Basilicata regional election, Bardi was appointed by Silvio Berlusconi himself as the centre-right candidate for the office of President of Basilicata, supported by Forza Italia, the Northern League and Brothers of Italy.

Bardi managed to win the elections and became the first centre-right governor of Basilicata in 49 years and after 24 uninterrupted years of centre-left leadership.

References

1951 births
Living people
People from Potenza
Italian generals
Presidents of Basilicata
Forza Italia (2013) politicians
21st-century Italian politicians